Henrik Jakobsen (born 16 December 1992) is a Norwegian handball player for GOG Håndbold and formerly the Norwegian national team.

He participated at the 2019 World Men's Handball Championship.

Honours
World Championship:
: 2019

References

External links

1992 births
Living people
Norwegian male handball players
People from Lørenskog
Expatriate handball players
Norwegian expatriate sportspeople in Denmark
Norwegian expatriate sportspeople in France
Sportspeople from Viken (county)